Miroslav Zeman (born 14 September 1946) is a wrestler who competed for Czechoslovakia. He won an Olympic bronze medal in Greco-Roman wrestling in 1968. He also competed at the 1972 Olympics, where he placed tied fourth.

References

External links
 
 

1946 births
Living people
Czech male sport wrestlers
Czechoslovak male sport wrestlers
Olympic bronze medalists for Czechoslovakia
Olympic wrestlers of Czechoslovakia
Olympic medalists in wrestling
Wrestlers at the 1968 Summer Olympics
Wrestlers at the 1972 Summer Olympics
Medalists at the 1968 Summer Olympics